Fusilier Dennis Donnini VC (17 November 1925 – 18 January 1945) was an English recipient of the Victoria Cross, the highest and most prestigious award for gallantry in the face of the enemy that can be awarded to British and Commonwealth forces.

Early life
Dennis Donnini was born to Italian-born Alfred Donnini and his English wife Catherine (née Brown), on 17 November 1925 in Easington Colliery. His father owned an ice cream parlour in Easington and attended Corby Grammar School in Sunderland, now known as St. Aidans School. Before he enlisted, Donnini had two brothers enter the military. Alfred Donnini was captured at Dunkirk and spent the rest of the war in a POW camp, while Lewis Donnini died of wounds on 1 May 1944.

Details
Donnini was 19 years old, and a fusilier in the 4th/5th Battalion, Royal Scots Fusiliers, British Army during the Second World War when the following deed took place for which he was awarded the VC.

On 18 January 1945 during Operation Blackcock, Fusilier Donnini's platoon was ordered to attack the small village of Stein in Selfkant Germany, close to the Dutch border. On leaving their trench they immediately came under heavy fire from a house and Fusilier Donnini was hit in the head. After recovering consciousness he charged 30 yards down the open road and hurled a grenade through the nearest window, whereupon the enemy fled pursued by Fusilier Donnini and the survivors of his platoon. He was wounded a second time, but continued firing his Bren gun until he was killed after the grenade he was carrying was hit by a bullet and exploded. His gallantry had enabled his comrades to overcome twice their own number of the enemy.

Donnini at 19 was the youngest soldier in the Second World War to be awarded the VC.

He is buried at the Commonwealth Cemetery in Sittard, The Netherlands.

Donnini is commemorated in the song "Donnini Doolally" by Easington singer Jez Lowe on his album Doolally.

See also
 British VCs of World War 2 (John Laffin, 1997)
 Monuments to Courage (David Harvey, 1999)
 The Register of the Victoria Cross (This England, 1997)

References

Further reading

External links
 Battle for the Roermond Triangle – revised version 2004 at www.operation-blackcock.com

1925 births
1945 deaths
Military personnel from County Durham
British World War II recipients of the Victoria Cross
Royal Scots Fusiliers soldiers
British Army personnel killed in World War II
English people of Italian descent
People from Easington, County Durham
British Army recipients of the Victoria Cross